Webber International University (Webber or WIU) is a private university in Babson Park, Florida.

History
Webber International was founded as Webber College by Roger Babson, an entrepreneur and business theorist in the first half of the 20th century. Established in 1927, it was the first private college chartered under Florida's then new charitable and educational laws, and one of the nation's first business schools for women. Webber International University now hosts men and women from some 48 different nations.

In February 2011, Webber announced a merger with St. Andrews College in Laurinburg, North Carolina.  In January 2014, Webber announced the acquisition of Virginia Intermont College in Bristol, Virginia, but these efforts were abandoned later the same year.

Academics
The university is accredited by the Commission on Colleges of the Southern Association of Colleges and Schools to award degrees at the associate, bachelor's, and master's levels.

Athletics 

The Webber International athletic teams are called the Warriors. The university is a member of the National Association of Intercollegiate Athletics (NAIA), primarily competing in the Sun Conference (formerly known as the Florida Sun Conference (FSC) until after the 2007–08 school year) for most of its sports since the 1990–91 academic year. Its football team formerly competed in the Mid-South Conference (MSC) until after the 2021 fall season. They are also a member of the National Christian College Athletic Association (NCCAA), primarily competing as an independent in the South Region of the Division I level.

Webber International competes in 22 intercollegiate varsity sports: Men's sports include baseball, basketball, bowling, cross country, football, golf, lacrosse, soccer, track & field and volleyball; while women's sports include basketball, beach volleyball, bowling, cheerleading, cross country, flag football, golf, lacrosse, soccer, softball, track & field and volleyball. Club sports include eSports and men's beach volleyball. The university also has an internationally respected bowling program.

Notable alumni 
 Vince Anderson, former NFL defensive back
 Verity Crawley, professional bowler in Professional Women's Bowling Association (PWBA)
 Bo Dallas, professional wrestler
 Gary Faulkner Jr., ten-pin bowler, competes on PBA Tour
 Taula "Hikuleo" Fifita, professional wrestler
 Daria Pająk, ten-pin bowler in Professional Women's Bowling Association (PWBA)

References

External links
 Official website
 Official athletics website

 
Educational institutions established in 1927
Universities and colleges in Polk County, Florida
Universities and colleges accredited by the Southern Association of Colleges and Schools
Private universities and colleges in Florida
1927 establishments in Florida